Nordic Institute of Asian Studies, or NIAS for short, is a university Institute for Asian studies of Copenhagen University in Denmark. The institute is located in Copenhagen and serve all five Nordic countries, comprising Denmark (including Greenland and Faroe Islands), Norway, Sweden, Finland and Iceland.

NIAS was established under the auspices of the Nordic Council of Ministers in 1968 as a Nordic focal point for research on Asia.

Structure and purpose 

On 1 January 2005, NIAS was incorporated as an independent academic institute under Danish University Law, and is now a centre at the Department of Political Science of the University of Copenhagen. The Department of Political Science has administrative and legal responsibility for NIAS, while the institute's independence is manifested through NIAS own strategy and research policy.

Library 
Nordic Institute of Asian Studies holds its own library, NIAS Library and Information Centre (NIAS LINC), serving the NIAS community. NIAS LINC has been a digital library since 2014.

Publication 
Nordic Institute of Asian Studies operate its own press, NIAS Press, focusing primarily on social sciences and history relating to contemporary Southeast Asia and East Asia, but not exclusively. NIAS Press presents authors from all over the world and publishes exclusively in English.

"Asia in Focus" is a peer-reviewed academic journal published twice a year on-line by NIAS.

See also 
 Nordic Centre in Shanghai

References

Sources

External links 
 

University of Copenhagen
Asian studies
Research institutes in Denmark
University presses of Denmark